Flight 602 may refer to:

 Flight 602 (album), an album by the band AIM
 "Flight 602", a song on Chicago III by the band Chicago
 Iberia Flight 602, which crashed in 1972
 Lionair Flight 602, which crashed in 1998

0602